Plotava is a rural locality (a selo) and the administrative center of Plotavsky Selsoviet, Bayevsky District, Altai Krai, Russia. The population was 717 as of 2013. There are 11 streets.

Geography 
Plotava is located 23 km north of Bayevo (the district's administrative centre) by road. Verkh-Chumanka is the nearest rural locality.

References 

Rural localities in Bayevsky District